The 1985 Eastern Michigan Hurons football team represented Eastern Michigan University in the 1985 NCAA Division I-A football season. In their third season under head coach Jim Harkema, the Hurons compiled a 4–7 record (3–6 against conference opponents), finished in a tie for sixth place in the Mid-American Conference, and were outscored by their opponents, 252 to 188. The team's statistical leaders included Ron Adams with 977 passing yards, Gary Patton with 631 rushing yards, and Don Vesling with 354 receiving yards.

Schedule

References

Eastern Michigan
Eastern Michigan Eagles football seasons
Eastern Michigan Hurons football